Eucrypta chrysanthemifolia is a species of flowering plant in the waterleaf family known by the common name spotted hideseed.

It is native to the southwestern United States, California, and adjacent Baja California. It can be found in a number of habitats from coast to mountain to desert.

Description
This is one of two species of Eucrypta, which are sticky, aromatic annual herbs.

The leaves are roughly oval in shape but are intricately divided into many lobes which are subdivided into many smaller lobes, making the leaf lacy in texture. Leaves higher up on the stem have fewer dissections.

The inflorescence holds a number of small flowers which droop as they grow heavier with the developing fruit. Each flower is less than a centimeter long and generally whitish in color. The fruit is a bristly capsule about 3 millimeters wide.

External links

Jepson Manual Treatment - Eucrypta chrysanthemifolia
USDA Plants Profile; Eucrypta chrysanthemifolia
Eucrypta chrysanthemifolia - Photo gallery

Hydrophylloideae
Flora of Baja California
Flora of California
Flora of Nevada
Flora of Arizona
Flora of the California desert regions
Flora of the Great Basin
Flora of the Sonoran Deserts
Flora of the Sierra Nevada (United States)
Natural history of the California chaparral and woodlands
Natural history of the California Coast Ranges
Natural history of the Central Valley (California)
Natural history of the Channel Islands of California
Natural history of the Colorado Desert
Natural history of the Mojave Desert
Natural history of the Peninsular Ranges
Natural history of the San Francisco Bay Area
Natural history of the Santa Monica Mountains
Natural history of the Transverse Ranges
Flora without expected TNC conservation status